"The Tra La La Song (One Banana, Two Banana)" is a 1968 pop song, which was the theme song for the children's television program The Banana Splits Adventure Hour. Originally released by Decca Records on the album titled We're the Banana Splits, the single release peaked at #96 on the Billboard Hot 100 on February 8, 1969 and also #96 in Canada, January 13, 1969. The writing of the song is credited to Mark Barkan and Ritchie Adams, who were the show's music directors. However, there are claims that the theme was written by jingle writer N. B. Winkless Jr. of the Leo Burnett Agency, but was credited to Adams and Barkan for contractual reasons. 

In 1995, Hollywood Library released the 1,000-copy limited-edition CD reissue We're the Banana Splits/Here Come the Beagles which, in addition to the original album version, includes an alternate version on the song.

Cover versions
American punk rock band The Dickies made the song a hit in the United Kingdom in 1979 with their cover version, marketed by A&M Records as "Banana Splits (Tra La La Song)". The record reached #7 in the UK Singles Chart.

References

1969 singles
1979 singles
Children's television theme songs
Songs written by Mark Barkan
1968 songs
Songs written by Ritchie Adams
The Banana Splits